Antonio Garay Jr. (born November 30, 1979) is a former American football nose tackle. He was drafted by the Cleveland Browns in the sixth round of the 2003 NFL Draft. He played college football and wrestled at Boston College. He was a NCAA wrestling All-American his sophomore year, placing 4th at the NCAA Championships while at Boston College.

Garay was also a member of the Chicago Bears, San Diego Chargers, and New York Jets.

He is notable for his outrageous hairstyles and for driving a Hello Kitty-themed smart car.

Early years
Garay is Jewish.  Garay's mother is Jewish and his father is a Catholic of Jamaican, Costa Rican, and Puerto Rican descent. He was exposed to both parents' faiths.  He attended Rahway High School in Rahway, New Jersey, and was a standout offensive and defensive lineman.  He was also the NJSIAA . state and national wrestling champion in 1998 and a high school All-American, winning the National High School Wrestling Tournament in Pittsburgh in 1998.

College career
He played college football and wrestled at Boston College. He was a NCAA wrestling All-American his sophomore year, placing 4th at the NCAA Championships while at Boston College in 2000. During the 2000 season, he was also named the Most Outstanding Wrestler at the East Coast Wrestling Association tournament (ECWA) for the second year.

Professional career

Chicago Bears
Garay spent two seasons with the Chicago Bears and was a member of the 2006 NFC Championship team.  In a December 2007 game against the Washington Redskins, Garay was injured by an illegal block.  He was placed on injured reserve for the remainder of the 2007 season.  On March 8, 2008, the Chicago Bears announced that they would part ways with the defensive tackle, and he became an unrestricted free agent on February 29, 2008.

New York Jets

On October 20, 2009, the New York Jets announced that they had signed Garay to their practice squad.

San Diego Chargers
Garay was signed off of the New York Jets' practice squad on December 9, 2009, by the San Diego Chargers. He was re-signed to a two-year deal on March 6, 2010. Garay was able to earn the starting job at nose tackle for the bulk of the 2010 season, and he finished 2010 with 48 tackles and 5.5 sacks, leading all San Diego defensive linemen in both categories.

Second stint with the Jets
Garay was signed by the New York Jets on March 15, 2013. He was released on August 31, 2013.

See also
List of select Jewish football players

References

External links
New York Jets bio
San Diego Chargers bio

1979 births
Living people
Sportspeople from Rahway, New Jersey
Players of American football from New Jersey
American football defensive tackles
Rahway High School alumni
Jewish American sportspeople
American people of Jamaican descent
American people of Puerto Rican descent
Boston College Eagles football players
Cleveland Browns players
Chicago Bears players
New York Jets players
San Diego Chargers players
21st-century American Jews